Greya piperella is a moth of the  family Prodoxidae. In North America it is found from southern British Columbia to central Oregon, west to western Montana. There is an isolated population in central California and the species is possibly also present in New Mexico and Utah. The habitat consists of open, grassy pine forests or rockfaces in open country.

The wingspan is 16.5-21.5 mm. The forewings are white or cream colored, sometimes with a stramineous (straw colored) tinge. There are various spots scattered over the wing. The hindwings are darker gray. Adults drink nectar from the flowers of the larval hosts.

The larvae feed on Heuchera cylindrica and Heuchera micrantha. The larvae mine the peduncle of the host plant.

References

Moths described in 1904
Prodoxidae